Nourish International is a social movement run by student leaders on 60 college campuses.

Nourish International currently has 60 chapters on college campuses. Through these chapters, Nourish has established a network of 800 students and 900 alumni. During the 2013-2014 school year, Nourish Ventures earned over $144,171 in profits. Since 2003, they have had 622 Nourish Project Interns work with international partnering organizations during the summer. During the Summer of 2014, they have estimated that Nourish Project Interns gave 36,051 hours of their time to partnering organizations in 28 communities across 12 countries.

History

2003: Sindhura Citineni and a group of students found Hunger Lunch at the University of North Carolina at Chapel Hill. Students sell rice, beans and cornbread on a weekly basis and use their profits to fund Nourish International’s first project: a nutrition initiative in Hyderabad, India.

2005: The Hunger Lunch Team places second in the Carolina Challenge, a business plan competition at UNC-CH. They decide that they want to take Hunger Lunch to other schools and change the name to Nourish International.

2006: Nourish International incorporates as a 501(c)3 non-profit and expansion begins. The first additional campuses include Duke, N.C. State and University of Michigan.

2008: The network of Nourish Chapters extends to two-dozen campuses after the inaugural Summer Institute training conference is held in Chapel Hill, NC. Nourish wins the N.C. Peace Prize.

2010: Nourish International continues to invest in each chapter’s ventures and projects.

2012: Nourish International welcomes the 2012-2013 Chapter Founders and expands the network to 29 campuses. Students continue to bridge the distance between communities and resources.

2013:  Nourish International expands the network to 45 campuses.

2014: Nourish International expands to 55 campuses and 5 high schools, with a total of 60 chapters in the US and Canada.

References

Non-profit organizations based in North Carolina